Love Affairs may refer to:
 Love Affairs (song), a 1983 song by Michael Martin Murphey
 Love Affair(s), a 2020 French drama film
 Love Affairs (1927 film), a German silent film

See also
 Love Affair (disambiguation)